Lee Young-sook (born 16 December 1965) is a South Korean sprinter. She competed in the 100 metres at the 1984, 1988 and the 1996 Summer Olympics.

References

External links
 

1965 births
Living people
Athletes (track and field) at the 1984 Summer Olympics
Athletes (track and field) at the 1988 Summer Olympics
Athletes (track and field) at the 1996 Summer Olympics
South Korean female sprinters
Olympic athletes of South Korea
Place of birth missing (living people)
Asian Games medalists in athletics (track and field)
Asian Games bronze medalists for South Korea
Athletes (track and field) at the 1986 Asian Games
Athletes (track and field) at the 1990 Asian Games
Athletes (track and field) at the 1994 Asian Games
Medalists at the 1986 Asian Games
Medalists at the 1990 Asian Games
Olympic female sprinters